Chunggang County is a kun, or county, in northern Chagang province, North Korea.  It was originally part of Huchang county in Ryanggang, and for that reason older sources still identify it as being part of Huchang.  The county seat was originally known as Chunggangjin (중강진), but is now known as Chunggang ŭp.  Chunggang looks across the Yalu River at China, and borders Ryanggang province to the south.

The Chunggang Revolutionary Site is associated with Kim Hyŏng-jik.

It has been reported that an Intermediate-range ballistic missile base was constructed in Chunggang in the early 1990s, and that its missiles are targeted at Okinawa.

Administrative divisions
Chunggang County is divided into 1 ŭp (town), 1 rodongjagu (workers' district) and 8 ri (villages):

Climate
Chunggang has a monsoon influenced humid continental climate (Köppen Climate Classification Dwa) with hot summers and severely cold winters. The climate features very large differences between summer and winter temperatures. On January 12, 1933, a temperature of -43 °C was recorded at Chunggangjin.  The average January temperature is -16.0 °C, with temperatures rising to a July average of 22.5 °C.

Notes

References

See also
Geography of North Korea
Administrative divisions of North Korea
Chagang
 Linjiang Yalu River Bridge

References

External links
Climatological data 

Counties of Chagang